The First Amendment or Amendment One/1 may refer to the:

First Amendment to the United States Constitution, regarding freedom of speech, freedom of the press, religious freedom, freedom of assembly, and right to petition
Australian Constitution Alteration (Senate Elections) Act, 1906, the first amendment to the Australian constitution
First Amendment of the Constitution of India, which amended several of the Fundamental Rights in India
First Amendment of the Constitution of Ireland, passed during World War II, concerning the declaration of a national emergency
First Amendment to the Constitution of Pakistan, which accounted for the secession of Bangladesh
First Amendment of the Constitution of South Africa, which made three technical changes
North Carolina Amendment 1, making marriage between one man and one woman the only domestic legal union